This is a list of butterflies of Chile. About 200 species are known from Chile.

Hesperiidae

Pyrginae
Urbanus dorantes dorantes
Urbanus proteus proteus
Polytrix octomaculatus octumaculatus
Chirgus barrosi
Chirgus bochoris trisignatus
Chirgus fides
Chirgus limbata limbata
Burnsius communis chloe
Burnsius notatus notatus
Burnsius notatus valdivianus
Burnsius orcus
Heliopyrgus americanus americanus
Erynnis funeralis

Hesperiinae
Butleria flavomaculata flavomaculata
Butleria flavomaculata valdiviana
Butleria flavomaculata tristriata
Butleria paniscoides paniscoides
Butleria paniscoides polyspila
Butleria elwesi
Butleria quilla
Butleria fruticolens
Butleria sotoi
Butleria philippi
Butleria bisexguttata
Argopteron aureipennis
Argopteron aureum
Argopteron puelmae
Hylephila ancora
Hylephila boulleti boulleti
Hylephila fasciolata
Hylephila isonira mima
Hylephila phyleus bisistrigata
Hylephila signata
Hylephila venusta venusta
Hylephila venusta haywardi
Lerodea gracia
Lerodea eufala
Quinta canae
Calpodes ethlius
Nyctelius nyctelius nyctelius

Pieridae

Coliadinae
Colias flaveola flaveola
Colias flaveola mendozina
Colias flaveola blameyi
Colias flaveola weberbaueri
Colias lesbia lesbia
Colias vauthierii vauthierii
Colias vauthierii cuninghami
Zerene caesonia caesonides
Phoebis sennae amphitrite
Terias deva chilensis
Teriocolias zelia kuscheli

Pierinae
Eroessa chilensis
Mathania leucothea
Pieris brassicae
Tatochila distincta fieldi
Tatochila mariae
Tatochila inversa razmilici
Tatochila autodice blanchardi
Tatochila authodice ernestae
Tatochila mercedis mercedis
Tatochila mercedis sterodice
Tatochila mercedis macrodice
Tatochila theodice theodice
Tatochila theodice gymnodice
Hypsochila galactodice
Hypsochila huemul
Hypsochila penai
Hypsochila argyrodice
Hypsochila wagenknechti wagenknechti
Hypsochila wagenknechti sulfurodice
Hypsochila microdice
Phulia nymphula nymphula
Pierphulia rosea rosea
Pierphulia rosea maria
Pierphulia isabella
Infraphulia ilyodes

Papilionidae
Battus polydamas archidamas

Lycaenidae

Theclinae
Strymon eurytulus
Strymon davara joannisi
Strymon sapota
Strymon crambusa
Strymon peristictos
Strymon daraba
Ministrymon azia
Chlorostrymon kuscheli
Chlorostrymon larancagua
Chlorostrymon chileana
Tergissima shargeli
Calycopis valparaiso
Eiseliana flavaria
Eiseliana rojasi
Eiseliana bicolor
Eiseliana probabila
Heoda wagenknechti
Heoda suprema
Heoda shapiroi
Heoda atacama
Heoda nivea
Heoda erani
Abloxurina muela putreensis
Pontirama coquimbiensis
Rhamma chilensis
Shapiroana herrerai
Rekoa palegon cyrriana
Penaincisalia oribata
Penaincisalia patagonaevaga

Polymmatinae
Itylos titicaca
Hemiargus ramon
Nabokovia faga
Nabokovia ada
Leptotes trigemmatus
Pseudolucia collina
Pseudolucia beyamini
Pseudolucia Iyrnessa
Pseudolucia hazeorum
Pseudolucia clarea
Pseudolucia plumbea
Pseudolucia annamaria
Pseudolucia scintilla
Pseudolucia vera
Pseudolucia chilensis
Pseudolucia lanin
Pseudolucia andina
Pseudolucia avishai
Pseudolucia sibylla
Pseudolucia penai
Pseudolucia aureliana
Pseudolucia oligocyanea
Pseudolucia argentina
Madeleinea ludrica
Madeleinea pelorias
Madeleinea sigal

Nymphalidae

Danainae
Danaus plexipus erippus

Satyrinae
Argyrophorus argenteus argenteus
Argyrophorus argenteus argenteus
Argyrophorus argenteus barrosi
Argyrophorus monticolens
Argyrophorus williamsianus
Argyrophorus penai
Argyrophorus gustavi
Cosmosatyrus chiliensis chiliensis
Cosmosatyrus chiliensis wygnanskii
Cosmosatyrus chiliensis magellanicus
Cosmosatyrus chiliensis elwesi
Cosmosatyrus leptoneuroides leptoneuroides
Cosmosatyrus leptoneuroides plumbeola
Faunula leocognele leucognele
Faunula leocognele eleates
Faunula patagonica
Tetraphlebia germaini
Tetraphlebia stelligera
Neosatyrus ambiorix
Homoeonympha vesagus
Homoeonympha boisduvali boisduvali
Homoeonympha boisduvali pusila
Homoeonympha humilis
Neomaenas coenonymphina
Neomaenas edmondsii
Neomaenas fractifascia
Neomaenas inornata
Neomaenas janiriodes
Neomaenas monachus
Neomaenas poliozona
Neomaenas servilia
Neomaenas simplex
Neomaenas wallengreni
Pamperis poaoenis
Auca coctei
Auca coctei nycteropus
Auca delessei
Auca pales
Spinanthenna tristis
Elina montroli
Elina vanessoides
Nelia calverti
Nelia nemyroides

Heliconiinae
Dione glycera
Agraulis vanillae
Yramea cytheris
Yramea lathonoides
Yramea modesta
Euptoieta claudia hortensia

Nymphalinae
Junonia vestina livia
Vanessa carye
Vanessa terpsichore

Libytheinae
Libythea carinenta carinenta

See also
List of butterflies of the Amazon River basin and the Andes

References

 
Butterflies

Chile
Chile